Koo Yun-cheol (Korean: 구윤철, born 1965) is a South Korean government official currently serving as the Minister for Government Policy Coordination since 2020. He previously served as the Vice Minister of Economy and Finance from 2018 to 2020.

Career 
After qualifying for the Public Administration Examination, he had been involved in various positions within the Ministry of Economy and Finance (including the predecessor Ministry of Planning and Budget). He also used to work at the Office of the President under the former President Roh Moo-hyun. During the presidency of Lee Myung-bak, he was a senior secretary of the Inter-American Development Bank.

Following the inauguration of the President Moon Jae-in, Koo became the Chief of Budget Office within the Ministry of Economy and Finance. He was promoted to the deputy head of the Ministry in December 2018.

Prior to the 2020 election, Koo was one of the potential candidate in Daegu-North Gyeongsang area. He, however, declined to run, citing, "I'm neither willing, nor not in a situation to run."

On 8 May 2020, Koo was appointed the new Minister for Government Policy Coordination.

He has been widely considered as the potential Deputy Prime Minister.

Education 
Koo is a graduate of Youngshin High School and read economics at Seoul National University. He obtained a master's degree in public policy at the University of Wisconsin–Madison, and a doctorate in business administration at Chung-Ang University.

References 

1965 births
Living people
South Korean politicians